Benedict Jay Poquette (born May 7, 1955) is a retired American basketball player in the National Basketball Association (NBA). Born in Ann Arbor, Michigan, he graduated from East Lansing High School and Central Michigan University. He was drafted by the Detroit Pistons in the second round (36th pick) of the 1977 NBA Draft, and played for them in 1978–79.  He also played for the Utah Jazz in 1980–83, the Cleveland Cavaliers in 1984–87, and the Chicago Bulls in 1987 (his last season in the NBA).

His best seasons in the league occurred while playing for the Utah Jazz.  The Jazz franchise had just arrived in Salt Lake City in 1979 after five mostly unsuccessful seasons in New Orleans.  The team was thin up front, having traded away top big men Rich Kelley, Spencer Haywood, Joe C. Meriweather, and Truck Robinson in the previous two seasons.  Despite being relatively undersized at 6'9" and 235 pounds, Poquette was tasked with replacing the 7'0" Kelley at center.  Poquette posted modest averages of 9.0 points and 6.6 rebounds per game in his four seasons with Jazz, but excelled at shot-blocking, setting franchise records for most blocks in a career (517 in 321 games) and single season (174 in 1980-81).  Notably, Poquette also had the somewhat dubious distinction of leading the NBA in personal fouls during that 1980-81 season, with 342 total fouls committed.

See also
List of National Basketball Association players with most blocks in a game

External links
 Basketball Reference page on Ben Poquette

1955 births
Living people
American expatriate basketball people in Italy
American men's basketball players
Basketball players from Ann Arbor, Michigan
Centers (basketball)
Central Michigan Chippewas men's basketball players
Chicago Bulls players
Cleveland Cavaliers players
Detroit Pistons draft picks
Detroit Pistons players
Nuova Pallacanestro Gorizia players
Power forwards (basketball)
Utah Jazz players